Karl Maria Demelhuber (26 May 1896 – 18 March 1988) was a German SS functionary during the Nazi era.

Reaching the rank of Obergruppenführer (General) in the Waffen-SS during World War II, he commanded the SS-Standarte Germania, 6th SS Mountain Division Nord, XII SS Corps and XVI SS Corps.

See also
List SS-Obergruppenführer

References

Holder of the SS Führerdegen

1896 births
1988 deaths
People from Freising
People from the Kingdom of Bavaria
SS-Obergruppenführer
German Army personnel of World War I
Gebirgsjäger of World War II
Recipients of the Order of the Cross of Liberty, 1st Class
Recipients of the clasp to the Iron Cross, 1st class
Recipients of the Military Merit Cross (Bavaria)
Military personnel of Bavaria
Waffen-SS personnel
20th-century Freikorps personnel